Kovanići is a village in the City of Zenica, Bosnia and Herzegovina. It is located on the south banks of the River Bosna.

Demographics 
According to the 2013 census, its population was 302, all Bosniaks.

References

Populated places in Zenica